Muriqui (also known as Vila Muriqui) is a district of the municipality of Mangaratiba, located within the Greater Rio de Janeiro, Brazil. It is part of the Green Coast. Highway BR-101 passes through the district.

The district has a patron saint, the Blessed Virgin Mary. Since the 1950s, the local parish has celebrated annually on the 27th of November, the date Catherine Labouré reportedly had a vision of her in 1830.

Etymology
The district was named after muriquis, a genus of spider monkeys. The name "muriqui" itself comes from a corruption of the word myraqui, of the Tupi language, with the alternates buriqui, barigui and baregui. According to Alcides Pissinatti, in "Management of Muriquis in Captivity" (2005):

However, according to von Martius' glossary, the word comes from the Tupi words jemoroo ("to nourish"; muru, "nutrient") and aiké (a contraction of aikobê: "to have", "to exist").

History

Colonial era 
Prior to 1567, all land that now belongs to Mangaratiba – including modern-day Muriqui – was part of the freguesia of Angra dos Reis, under the Captaincy of São Vicente. After that date, those lands became part of the (Royal) Captaincy of Rio de Janeiro. In 1568, the colonization of the region of modern-day Mangaratiba begins through the distribution of land to the Sá family.

At some point before 1598 – the year  came to Rio de Janeiro to take office as governor –  finished building a new engenho (the fifth sugarcane mill of Rio de Janeiro). As per the recounting of Anthony Knivet:

The engenho was known as Engenho of Saint Gregory. According to Vieira de Mello, this engenho was located in Itacuruçá, the district which Muriqui was part of until the middle of the 20th century, and thus later became known as "Engenho of Itacuruçá". Additionally, Mirian Bondim claims that this engenho was located in the same place as modern-day Muriqui, and it is referred to by the Mangaratiba town hall as the first construction in Mangaratiba land.

On 8 June 1652, D. Suzana Peixoto and her husband, Dom José Rendon de Quebedo, exchanged an engenho they owned in Irajá, known as "Engenho Fumaça", for the Engenho of Itacuruçá and some farms in Mangaratiba.

D. Maria de Alarcão e Quebedo inherited the property after the death of Dom José Rendon and, on 17 May 1718, sold it for 600 mil-réis to priest Nicoláo de Siqueira. She donated two thirds of the payment to the local church, "for herself and the souls of all the buried there".

Late modern period 
As a part of a series of expansions to the Central Railway of Brazil, on 7 November 1914, the Muriqui train station was inaugurated.

On 1 December 1949, via a legislative decree, the district of vila de Muriqui is delimited on land previously belonging to the district of Itacuruçá, and annexed to the municipality of Mangaratiba.

Population

Administration

Being a district of the larger municipality of Mangaratiba, Muriqui is subject to the administration of Mangaratiba's prefecture – i.e. its mayor and municipal government. However, a subprefecture dedicated exclusively to Muriqui exists.

The following is a list of heads ("subprefeitos") of the subprefecture of Muriqui:

Fauna and Flora
Muriqui is surrounded mostly by Atlantic Forest, which heavily influences its fauna and flora.

Hydrography

Beaches 
In terms of balneability, the Muriqui beach has been mostly deemed improper for bathing, although there have been recent efforts in an attempt to clean Mangaratiba rivers and beaches.

Rivers 

Muriqui is centered between two rivers, with Rio Catumbi to the east and Rio Muriqui (sometimes called Rio da Prata) to the west.

To mitigate the risk of flooding, both rivers are periodically dredged by the district's subprefecture.

Culture

Art 
Muriqui is home to an art installation by Japanese artist Mariko Mori called Ring: One With Nature, inaugurated atop the Bride's Veil waterfall in August 2016 to celebrate the 2016 Summer Olympics. The piece is an acrylic ring that changes in color depending on the position of the sun, and is meant as a representation of a sixth Olympic ring.

Cuisine 

Muriqui's most well known delicacy is the cocada (known as Cocada de Muriqui), deemed to be one of the famous sweets of the Mangaratiba cuisine. According to Fabrini dos Santos, a SEBRAE consultant, the cocadas are distinctive enough that they could, at some point, be granted a geographical indication. The district's cocada has existed at least since the construction of the BR-101 highway, and has been sold on its shoulders ever since.

The coconut-based dessert has had such a cultural impact that, in March 2018, the "Cocada Party of Muriqui" was added to the municipality's official event calendar, to be celebrated annually on the last weekend of the month of July.

Folklore 
Muriqui has its own folklore, limited to the region, and separate from the national-level folklore.

The story of the "Vieira Wind" is part of the oral tradition of the district. The tale is usually related to the high-speed winds in the area during winter (roughly in the period from the end of August to the start of September).

The first and more common one, which has been retold by Mangaratiba's official culture manager Fundação Mario Peixoto, was described by local newspaper Jornal Litoral in 2015 as follows:

The second version, arguably more grounded in reality, although less common, is as follows:

Sport 

Muriqui is the birthplace of a proeminent football player, Luiz Guilherme Silva, nicknamed Muriqui himself. As of October 2020, he plays for Chinese Super League club Cangzhou Mighty Lions. In 2018, he was elected the sixth most influential football player in China's history.

Muriqui is also home to its own football club, Muriqui Football Club – along with the Muriqui Football Club Stadium. Among other events, it hosts the Municipal Veterans Championship.

Notable people 

This is a non-exhaustive list of notable people born in Muriqui:

 José Leandro de Carvalho (–1834), painter
 Luiz Guilherme Silva (1986–), footballer

Notes

References

Bibliography

Further reading

External links 
 "Vieira wind in Muriqui" (YouTube video by Renato Rodrigues).

Populated places in Rio de Janeiro (state)